Theory of Probability and Its Applications is a quarterly peer-reviewed scientific journal published by the Society for Industrial and Applied Mathematics. It was established in 1956 by Andrey Nikolaevich Kolmogorov and is a translation of the Russian journal Teoriya Veroyatnostei i ee Primeneniya. It is abstracted and indexed by Mathematical Reviews and Zentralblatt MATH. Its 2014 MCQ was 0.12. According to the Journal Citation Reports, the journal has a 2014 impact factor of 0.520.

References

External links 

Publications established in 1956
English-language journals
SIAM academic journals
Quarterly journals
Probability journals